Enaam is a given name. Notable people with the name include:

 Enaam Ahmed (born 2000), British racing driver of Pakistani descent
 Enaam Arnaout (born 1962), Syrian American criminal
 Enaam Elgretly (born 1944), Egyptian actress